NH 106 may refer to:

 National Highway 106 (India)
 New Hampshire Route 106, United States